Elachista flavicilia is a moth of the family Elachistidae that is endemic to Australia.

The forewings are rusty brown intermixed with bluish white scales forming irregular longitudinal stripes, except near the margins. The hindwings are grey.

References

Moths described in 2011
Endemic fauna of Australia
flavicilia
Moths of Australia
Taxa named by Lauri Kaila